Godfridah Sumaili (born May 26, 1957) is a Zambian reverend  and is the first Minister of National Guidance and Religious Affairs. Sumaili did not run for a Member of parliament seat and received a nominated seat by Edgar Lungu on 15 September 2016.

References

External links
Website of the National Assembly (Parliament) of Zambia

Living people
National Guidance and Religious Affairs ministers of Zambia
Members of the National Assembly of Zambia
Patriotic Front (Zambia) politicians
Zambian Christians
1957 births